Patricia Amy Rowlands (19 January 1931 – 22 January 2005) was an English actress who is best remembered for her roles in the Carry On films series, as Betty Lewis in the ITV Thames sitcom Bless This House, and as Alice Meredith in the Yorkshire Television sitcom Hallelujah!.

Early years
She was born in Palmers Green, London and attended the Sacred Heart convent school at Whetstone. While attending, an elocution teacher spotted her potential and encouraged her to pursue a career in acting. She applied for the Guildhall School of Music and Drama, and won a scholarship aged fifteen.

Early career
Rowlands began her career in the chorus of Annie Get Your Gun, followed by a summer season in Torquay. She then spent several years with the Players' Theatre in London, before making her West End debut in Sandy Wilson's musical Valmouth. It was at this time she met her future husband, the composer Malcolm Sircom. They divorced in 1967.

Other West End theatre credits included Semi-Detached with Laurence Olivier and directed by Tony Richardson (with whom she was to work often, appearing in his 1963 film Tom Jones), Shut Your Eyes and Think of England, with Donald Sinden, The Seagull and Ben Travers's The Bed Before Yesterday, both directed by Lindsay Anderson and When We Are Married for Ronald Eyre. She also starred in Cameron Mackintosh's revival of Oliver! in the mid-1990s, as well as playing Jack's mother in the original London cast of Sondheim's Into the Woods. Her final appearance was as Mrs Pearce in the National Theatre's production of My Fair Lady which also starred Jonathan Pryce.

Rowlands also appeared quite frequently on television early in her career. Amongst the various series in which she appeared, were several appearances in Gert and Daisy (1959) as Bonnie, as well as appearing in 2 episodes of Danger Man (as different, unrelated characters) and in The Avengers episode "Love All". Rowlands played the role of a love interest for George called "Beryl" in the 1979 Christmas special and final episode of George and Mildred

From 1969 to 1991
She made her debut in the Carry On films in Carry On Again Doctor in 1969 and soon became a regular member of the repertory company of performers, usually playing the dowdy, put-upon wife or the long-suffering secretary. Between 1969 and 1975 she appeared in nine of the films in increasingly large roles, appearing in Carry On Again Doctor, Carry On Loving, Carry On Henry, Carry On Matron, Carry On Abroad and Carry On Dick - more substantial roles include Carry On At Your Convenience, Carry On Girls and Carry On Behind.

On 7 March 1971, she starred in a single episode (You've Really Landed Me In It This Time) of the ITV sitcom Doctor at Large, with Barry Evans and George Layton, as a nymphomaniac secretary, the kind of role she had played in Carry On Loving.

From 1971 to 1976, she played Betty, the feckless neighbour in the ITV sitcom Bless This House, which starred fellow Carry On star Sid James. Her other television credits at this time included a couple of episodes of For the Love of Ada, playing a pregnant woman in the maternity ward also appearances with comedians such as Les Dawson and Dick Emery. In the early 1980s, she appeared with Thora Hird in the sitcom Hallelujah!, in which they played an aunt and niece in The Salvation Army. In 1991, she appeared in an episode of Zorro filmed in Madrid, Spain.

Rowlands also appeared in screen versions of two of Frances Hodgson Burnett's books: the television film Little Lord Fauntleroy (1980), as Mrs. Dibble, and a TV dramatisation of  A Little Princess (1986) as the baker's wife.

Later years
Towards the end of her life, Rowlands appeared in several revivals of major musicals such as Oliver! at the London Palladium and My Fair Lady at the Theatre Royal, Drury Lane.

Rowlands later television credits include The Cazalets, The Canterbury Tales, The Cater Street Hangman, Get Well Soon, Vanity Fair, Murder Most English, and Bottom for the BBC. In 2002, she was a guest on the paranormal series Most Haunted. Rowlands took part in several DVD audio commentaries along with other surviving stars of the Carry On films in 2003.

Death
Rowlands developed breast cancer and had to abandon her plans to become an acting teacher, and quietly retire. She died of the disease in an East Sussex hospice, three days after her 74th birthday. She was survived by her only son, Alan (born 1963).

Filmography

Television roles

Comedy

Children's

Drama
{| class="wikitable"
! Year !! Title !! Role !! Notes
|-
|1961 || Danger Man || Mrs. Harkness ||
|-
|1964 || Danger Man || Mrs. Farebrother ||
|-
|1965 || Out of the Unknown - Come Buttercup, Come Daisy, Come...? || Anne Lovejoy ||
|-
|1969 || The Avengers || Thelma || Episode: "Love All"
|-
|1976 ||  Cinema Fire Safety Short Film : ' Fire Doors Save Lives '. || Ada : Tealady || Now listed under IMDB's Working Title Public Information Film , & , in Rowland's IMDB's Filmography.
|-
|2001 || The Cazalets || The Governess ||
|}

References

External links
 
 Obituary in The Guardian Obituary in The Independent''

1931 births
2005 deaths
Actresses from London
Deaths from cancer in England
Deaths from breast cancer
English film actresses
English television actresses
English musical theatre actresses
English stage actresses
People from Palmers Green
20th-century English singers
British comedy actresses
20th-century English women singers